Nuutele is an island that consists of a volcanic tuff ring. It lies 1.3 km off the eastern end of Upolu island, Samoa.

Nuutele, together with Nuulua, a smaller island in the Aleipata group, are significant conservation areas for native species of bird life. Nuutele features steep terrain, with vertical marine cliffs up to 180 m high.

Nuutele is famous as a highly appreciated scenic landmark when viewed in the distance from the popular Lalomanu beach area on nearby Upolu Island, across the water.

See also

 Samoa Islands
 List of islands
 Desert island

Notes
  (includes Nu'utele)
 Some information about Nu'utele and Nu'ulua.

References 

Uninhabited islands of Samoa
Volcanoes of Samoa
Tuff cones
Nature conservation in Samoa
Biota of Samoa
Atua (district)